Los Osos Back Bay is a prehistoric Chumash archaeological site in the Los Osos Valley, near the coast in San Luis Obispo County, California. 

These ancient Californian Native Americans had a significant settlement, now named "Los Osos Back Bay," on a stabilized sand dune. It is to the west of the Elfin Forest Natural Area, which  has another midden within it.

Los Osos Back Bay is also the present day name for the southernmost part of the Morro Bay estuary, known by the locals as "the back bay." It is where the native Chumash at the eponymous archaeological site gathered marine resources, as coastal tribes along this part of the California coast regularly did.

See also
 Los Osos Creek
 Los Osos Oaks State Natural Reserve

References

Archaeological sites in California
Chumash
Morro Bay
History of San Luis Obispo County, California
Native American history of California